Grabenbach  is a river of Baden-Württemberg, Germany.

The Grabenbach is a left tributary of the Ablach in Meßkirch. During its course, it changed its name several times: Dorfbach, Talbach, Weiherbach, Mühlenbach, Stadtbach, Grabenbach; in former times partly also Heudorfer Bach; this is also how it is called on its entire length by Baden-Württemberg's authority for water protection.

See also
List of rivers of Baden-Württemberg

Rivers of Baden-Württemberg
Rivers of Germany